Montana Mines is an unincorporated community located in Marion County, West Virginia, United States.

References 

Unincorporated communities in West Virginia
Coal towns in West Virginia
Unincorporated communities in Marion County, West Virginia